North Macquarie is a suburb of Wollongong in the City of Shellharbour in New South Wales, Australia, 4 km west of Albion Park.

References 

Suburbs of Wollongong
City of Shellharbour